The 2008 Maui Invitational Tournament, an annual early-season college basketball tournament held in Lahaina, Hawaii, was held November 20-22 at Lahaina Civic Center.  The winning team was North Carolina.

Bracket

References

Maui Invitational Tournament
Maui Invitational
Maui Invitational